Jonathan Harold Esmond Vere Harmsworth, 4th Viscount Rothermere (born 3 December 1967), is a British peer and inheritor of a newspaper and media empire founded by his great-grandfather Harold Sidney Harmsworth, 1st Viscount Rothermere.  He is the chairman and controlling shareholder of the Daily Mail and General Trust, formerly "Associated Newspapers", a media conglomerate which includes the Daily Mail.

Early life and career
Lord Rothermere was educated at Gordonstoun School and Duke University.

Harmsworth held various positions in Associated Newspapers and was managing director of the Evening Standard, when the sudden death of his father in 1998 resulted in his becoming the controlling shareholder and chairman of Associated and of its parent Daily Mail and General Trust just before his 31st birthday. One change he has instituted since becoming chairman is requiring directors to retire at age 75.

He has non-domicile (non-dom) tax status and owns his media businesses through a complex structure of offshore holdings and trusts.

According to the International Business Times:

In 2013, Private Eye reported that the non-dom status could be in doubt because of his stately home, Ferne House in Wiltshire, and status as a Freeman of the City of London.

He was a supporter of the former Conservative Party leader David Cameron.

He ranked fourth in the Publishing, Advertising, and PR section of The Sunday Times Rich List of 2013 with an estimated wealth of £720 million. In April 2015, The Sunday Times estimated his net worth at £1 billion.

The BBC's Newsnight programme at the end of January 2017 reported that former prime minister David Cameron had approached Lord Rothermere to sack Eurosceptic Paul Dacre, the editor of the Daily Mail in the run up to the 2016 EU membership referendum. A representative of Lord Rothermere refused to confirm or deny the story, although a spokesman for Cameron confirmed that he had tried to persuade both Dacre and Rothermere over the vote. Rothermere's representative told the media: "Over the years, Lord Rothermere has been leant on by more than one prime minister to remove Associated Newspapers' editors but, as he told Lord Justice Leveson on oath, he does not interfere with the editorial policies of his papers".

Lord Rothermere chairs the Imperial War Museum foundation, following the tradition set by his great grandfather, the first Viscount.

Personal life
Rothermere married Claudia DeVriese, daughter of Terence J. Clemence, on 15 July 1993. They have five children:
Vere Richard Jonathan Harold (b. November 1994)
Eleanor Patricia Margaret (b. November 1996)
Theodora Mairi Ferne (b. July 2001)
Iris Geraldine Lilian (b. 2004)
Alfred Northcliffe St. John (b. 2010)
In 2002, The Guardian reported that Rothermere had fathered at least one more child prior to his marriage. Rothermere confirmed this in his testimony to the Leveson Inquiry.

Arms

References

External links

1967 births
British billionaires
21st-century British newspaper publishers (people)
Conservative Party (UK) hereditary peers
Daily Mail and General Trust people
Jonathan
Kent School alumni
Living people
People educated at Gordonstoun
People with non-domiciled status in the United Kingdom
4
Place of birth missing (living people)
Rothermere